Stephan Daniel Trano (born February 1, 1969, in France) is a French-American journalist and author based in New York City, New York. He received his BA in History from Columbia University, New York. He collaborates to the French weekly news magazine L'Express and was previously a guest columnist for the French news magazines Le Point and Marianne.

Biographer

Trano has authored three biographical essays:

 In 2000, on François Mitterrand, Mitterrand, Les Amis D’abord Trano explored the former French president's personal networks in-depth. The French historian Jean Lacouture prefaced the book: "François Mitterrand, whose public life is arranged traditionally around three or four parties, including one he roughly forged, confided in me that "in politics, everything is a matter of banding together," which could also have been said, of religion, by a general of the Jesuits in their heyday. And when he defined a friend as he in whom nothing, neither Bousquet, nor failure, nor insult, could alter public or private loyalty, he seemed to speak less as a politician or secular moralist than as an adherent of a religious order. Stephan Trano suggests, line by line, that the reason for the State has reasons other than the reason of the heart. And that loyalty, noble virtue that it is, can be, in the public order, incompatible with the general interest." Trano's biography included the first authorized conversation with Mitterrand's daughter Mazarine Pingeot (since then known as Mazarine Pingeot-Mitterrand), where she confesses about her relationship with her father.

 In 2006, with Une Affaire d’Amitie, Trano extended its work to Mitterrand's families. Mazarine Pingeot wrote the preface, and the former French Minister of Culture from 1981 to 1997 under Mitterrand, Jack Lang, signed the postface.
 An essay about John Fitzgerald Kennedy (November 2013, L'Archipel), "a character built by his entourage (...) Appointed by his father to fulfill his own presidential destiny (...), the first politician invented by the new dominant post-war mass media and shaped by marketing." According to the author, the legend of Kennedy was "carefully maintained by censorship and powerfully organized by his family, and then conveyed by historians. However, his diseases (...), his obsession with women, his dangerous relationships, the wandering of his political thought... (...) represent everything America usually hates: concealment, perjury, betrayal, corruption. Fifty years after his death, the best-hidden mystery of the icon of American lies not in his murder, but in a life totally concealed by myth."

Journalist
At the age of 18, Trano's first news articles appeared in the weekly magazine Le Nouvel Observateur (The New Observer), founded in 1950 by philosopher Jean-Paul Sartre in conjunction with former members of the French Resistance. He first began as a celebrity lifestyle reporter but soon became a political journalist.

From 1991 to 1996, Trano served as Chief Political Editor of the weekly Tribune Juive (Jewish Tribune). Recognized by the French intellectual community, he reported on controversial issues of public interest for several major publications.

In 1996, Trano became the first Jewish journalist to work under dual Middle East leadership—Palestinian National Authority and Israeli supervision—after being appointed as Co-Chief Editor of the short-lived Palestinian Economic Newsletter, a monthly publication to promote economic development in the Gaza Strip and West Bank under the Oslo Accords of 1993. With a circulation of 15,000, it was published in English, French and Arabic. Yasser Arafat wrote its first editorial when it was published in June 1996. It was published for seven months.

Political advisory
Trano has served in prominent political advisory roles, including:
 Special Advisor to Patrick Gaubert, then Head of the French governmental mission against racism and anti-Semitism (1991–1995)
 Special Advisor to the President of the NATO-affiliated organization International League against Racism and Anti-Semitism (1993)
 Special Advisor to Jean Kahn, President of the Conseil Representatif des Institutions juives de France (Council of French Jewish Institutions), (1993–1996), and President of  the European Jewish Congress (1993 to 1995)

In 2005–2006, Trano was Director of Online Communications and the author for Jack Lang, President of the Arab World Institute, former NATO-based French anti-piracy expert, and French Minister of Culture and Communications from 1981 to 1995.

Trano has received attention for his contributions to public debate by questioning, in many articles:
 The future of the remembrance of the Shoah
 The issue of ethnocentrism
 The morality of the partners of the peace process in the Middle East
 Discrimination against minorities in Europe
 Anti-Americanism in France
 Endangered populations

Experts often quote his work:

 During a session of the Senate in Belgium, December 14, 2000, in a debate with Prime Minister Michiel Martens about a proposal for a resolution on the right of return for Palestinian Refugees: Proposal for resolution on the right of return for Palestinian refugees
 Regarding Holocaust monuments and national memorial cultures in France and Germany since 1989: the origins and political function of the Vel d'Hiv in Paris and the Holocaust Monument in Berlin ( quoted page 97)

In 1996, Trano was one of the 234 public figures who signed a petition for the legal recognition of same-sex couples: For a legal recognition of homosexual couples

Other contributions with excerpts from columns 

 In Libération:

 Culture de la Mémoire, Culture du Malheur, (Culture of Memory, Culture of Woe), Tribune, April 29, 1995

 Le Bon Juif Selon Le Pen, (The Good Jew According to Le Pen) - Tribune, June 16, 1995

 Commémorer d'autres Génocides, (Commemorating Other Genocides), Tribune, January 26, 1995.

 En finir avec la Paix des dupes, (Ending the Peace Dupes), Tribune, October 1, 1997.

 Israël doit trouver les mots (Israel Must Find the Words), Tribune, November 4, 2000

 In Le Monde:

 Le trouble des Juifs de France, de Jean-Michel Dumay, (The Turmoil of the Jews of France, by Jean-Michel Dumay), September 24, 1993

Citations and references about the author

Israel and Palestine 
 Negotiating the non-negotiable: the Israeli-Palestinian talks in Norway, 1993 in Systems, Man, and Cybernetics, 1994. 'Humans, Information and Technology,' 1994 IEEE International Conference
 Proposal for resolution on the right of return for Palestinian refugees (Mr. Michiel Maertens et al., Doc. 2-507)

L'Oreal legal case 
 Ugly Beauty: Helena Rubinstein, L'Oréal, and the Blemished History of Looking Good by Ruth Brandon (Feb 1, 2011)
 L'Oreal 1909-2009 (Editions Française) par Jacques Marseille

Politics of Memory 
 Holocaust Monuments and National Memory: France and Germany since 1989 by Peter Carrier (Sep 27, 2006)
 L'Année Céline, Volume 1995, Du Lerot/IMEC (1996)
 Le joker juif: ou du "fait hébreu" comme argument polémique, Ange-Mathieu Mezzadri, Autres Temps (2002)

François Mitterrand 
 Francois Mitterrand: A Political Biography (Polity Political Profiles Series) by David Scott Bell (Oct 28, 2005)
 French XX Bibliography: Critical and Bibliographical References for the Study of French Literature Since 1885, Index to Volume Is (Nos. 41-45) (French XX Bibliography Index) (Feb 1997)
 French XX Bibliography #41: Critical and Biographical References for the Study of French Literature Since 1885 by Douglas W. Alden, Peter C. Hoy and Christine M. Zunz (Sept 1989)

In English 
in The Jewish Chronicle:
 When Henry Met Francoise, with Valerie Monchi, July 2, 1993.
 Jewish Voters Face Thorny Dilemma, with Valerie Monchi, April 28, 1995.
 The Mitterrand Years: A Decade of "Ambiguous" Middle-East Policy, with Valerie Monchi, March 26, 1993.
 Mitterrand's Vichyst Past: A New Facet in a Complex History with Jews, by Valerie Monchi, September 30, 1994.
"Stupid Mistake" Leads to "Dachau" Knickers, by Stéphane Trano, October 7, 1994.
 The world of Finance tempted by boss Romney
 Trayvon Martin: The hoddie that kills
 Human rights have deteriorated under Obama
 For Obama, the carnage of Aurora has nothing to do with firearms
 Islamgate in America?
 David Cameron in full delirium against Francois Hollande's France
 Bin Laden's letters: Washington's incredible mistake against France
 And here we are again: French media blame the president
 American Spring Causes Anguis in Politicians in the US
 Facebook co-founder scandalizes the U.S Congress
 Washington no longer hiding its relief after Sarkozy's departure
 How everything shifted between Paris and Washington

Bibliography 

 La Terre malade des Hommes, Paris, Avec Philippe Desbrosses, Editions du Rocher, Paris, 1992. An essay about global warming, global pollution, and alternatives to the massive exploitation of seas and lands for food purposes.
 L'Intelligence verte, Paris, avec Philippe Desbrosses, Editions du Rocher, Paris, 1997.Second Edition.
 Un rabbin dans la Cite, avec Gilles Bernheim, Editions Calmann-Lévy, 1997. An essay about the story of Gilles Bernheim, French philosopher and rabbi, and currently Chief Rabbi of France, elected on June 22, 2008, who was appointed a Knight [Chevalier] in the Légion d'honneur on April 10, 2009, by the French Government. 
 Mitterrand, Les Amis d'abord , Paris, Editions L'Archipel, 2000. Preface by Jean Lacouture. Interview with Mazarine Pingeot-Mitterrand. A biography of former French President François Mitterrand (president from 1981 to 1988 and 1988–1995, d. on January 8, 1996), with a preface by the world-renowned French journalist, historian, and biographer, Jean Lacouture (the official biographer of General De Gaulle) and featuring the first exclusive interview with Mitterrand's long-time hidden daughter, Mazarine Pingeot. 
 Mitterrand, Une Affaire d'Amitie , second edition, Editions L'Archipel, Paris, 2006. Preface by Mazarine Pingeot-Mitterrand, and conclusion by Jack Lang. [1]Second edition of the above with preface by Mazarine Pingeot and an afterword by long-time French Minister of Culture and Communication, Jack Lang. 
 Vive La Terre , collective book, Editions Solar, Paris, 2007, Preface by Nicolas Hulot. A collective work of nonfiction written by and edited under Stephane Trano with contributions from experts on global climate change. 
 Kennedy ou L'Invention du Mensonge

Member 
International Federation of Journalists
Society of Professional Journalists
National Writers Union

References

French political writers
French journalists
20th-century French Jews
Living people
1969 births
French male non-fiction writers